Hughes Island is a small ice-covered island, the easternmost of the Lyall Islands, lying just to the east of the entrance to Yule Bay, Victoria Land, Antarctica. This island, along with many other islands within the same geographical bay, was first mapped by the USGS from surveys and U.S. Navy air photos in 1960–63, it was named by US-ACAN for Lieutenant Ronald M. Hughes, medical officer at McMurdo Station in 1966. This island lies situated on the Pennell Coast, a portion of Antarctica lying between Cape Williams and Cape Adare.

Islands of Victoria Land
Pennell Coast